Jonathan E. Meredith (born Apia, July 8, 1978) is a Samoan rugby union player. He plays as a hooker.

Career
He debuted for Samoa in a match against Ireland, at Lansdowne Road, on November 11, 2001. He was also part of the 2003 Rugby World Cup roster, where he played 4 matches. His last international cap was during a match against Fiji, at Suva, on July 30, 2005. He also played for Auckland in the NPC.

References

External links
Jonathan Meredith international statistics
John E. Meredith at New Zealand Rugby History

1978 births
Sportspeople from Apia
Samoan expatriates in New Zealand
Living people
Samoan rugby union players
Rugby union hookers
Samoa international rugby union players